Ryan Abbott (born 25 June 1991) is a former professional Australian rules footballer playing for  and  in the Australian Football League (AFL).

Abbott is from Grovedale, Victoria. He played basketball from 14 and continued until 21. Abbott later played for the Grovedale Tigers in the Geelong Football League, winning consecutive best and fairests. He also played for Geelong's Victorian Football League (VFL) side, performing well against Jake Spencer, an AFL-listed ruckman for Melbourne. Abbott was selected by Geelong with pick 69 in the 2016 national draft. He fractured his leg in a marking contest at training, which was expected to sideline him until January 2017. Abbott returned, but suffered a stress fracture in his back. He played 15 VFL games in 2017 and came seventh in Geelong's VFL best and fairest. In 2018, Abbott was selected for his AFL debut in round 20 against  at the Melbourne Cricket Ground. He matched up with Toby Nankervis, recording 22 hitouts and two goals.

References

External links 

 
 

Living people
1991 births
Grovedale Football Club players
Geelong Football Club players
Australian rules footballers from Victoria (Australia)